Al-Mitras (also spelled Mtrass) is a village in northwestern Syria, administratively part of the Tartus Governorate, located southeast of Tartus. Nearby localities include Marmarita and Zweitina to the east, al-Zarah to the southeast, al-Tulay'i to the southwest, al-Sisiniyah to the west and al-Bariqiyah to the north. According to the Syria Central Bureau of Statistics (CBS), al-Mitras had a population of 2,138 in the 2004 census. Its inhabitants are predominantly Sunni Muslims.

References

Populated places in Safita District